Sir Ganga Ram Hospital is a 550-bed hospital in Lahore, Pakistan. This was the original hospital established by Sir Ganga Ram, a Civil Engineer who served the British government. He established it in Lahore in 1921 during the British Raj, 26 years before the Partition of British India.

Enroachment 
On 21 May 2021, it was cleared of encroachments and restored on the orders of Imran Khan. It is scheduled to be reopened.

History
Sir Ganga Ram Hospital was established in 1921, at the end of WWI in the walled city of Lahore. The benefactor, Sir Ganga Ram, was a civil engineer and leading philanthropist of his time who also donated land for the site. In 1943 during WWII, the hospital was shifted to its present location to cope with the growing demand for medical and health care services. After the partition in 1947, India built another "Sir Ganga Ram Hospital" in New Delhi.

Associated medical college
In 1944, the family of Sir Ganga Ram started a medical college by the name Balak Ram Medical College named after a son of Sir Ganga Ram. The college was closed soon after the independence of Pakistan in 1947 and its premises were abandoned. Fatima Jinnah Medical University was established in 1948 on the same land and named after Fatima Jinnah, the sister of Muhammad Ali Jinnah.

Sir Ganga Ram Hospital is now an affiliated hospital to the Fatima Jinnah Medical University. It is now being extended over another 22 kanals land and will provide an additional 400 beds. Although it is an all-female medical college, the faculty consists of highly qualified male teachers as well as female teachers. The college has well-equipped laboratories, an airconditioned dissection hall, lecture theatres with audio-visual aids for teaching purposes, a pathology museum, clinical academic rooms, a well-equipped library, and an auditorium for seminars and international conferences. A purpose-built accident and emergency department have been added.

The hostel for students is within walking distance of the college. It consists of six blocks. Two new blocks are being built to accommodate more students. At the moment there are around one thousand students living in the hostel.

Recognition
Accredited by College of Physicians and Surgeons of Pakistan.

In literature
A marble statue of Sir Ganga Ram once stood in a public square on Mall Road in Lahore. Famous Urdu writer Saadat Hasan Manto (known for his famous satire "Toba Tek Singh") wrote a satire on persons who were trying to obliterate any memory of any Hindu in Lahore after Pakistan came into existence. In his story "Garland" based on a true incident on the frenzy of religious riots of 1947, an inflamed mob in Lahore, after attacking a residential area, turned to attack the statue of Sir Ganga Ram, a Hindu philanthropist of Lahore. They first pelted the statue with stones; then smothered its face with coal tar. Then a man made a garland of old shoes and climbed up to put it around the neck of the statue. The police arrived and opened fire. Among the injured was the fellow with the garland of old shoes. As he fell, the mob shouted: "Let us rush him to Sir Ganga Ram Hospital" forgetting that they were trying to obliterate the memory of the very person who had founded the hospital where the person was to be taken for saving his life.

References

External links
About Sir Ganga Ram Hospital, Lahore, Pakistan
About Sir Ganga Ram Hospital, New Delhi, India

Hospital buildings completed in 1921
Hospital buildings completed in 1943
Teaching hospitals in Pakistan
Hospitals in Lahore
Hospitals established in 1921
1921 establishments in British India